Agrotis lata is a moth of the family Noctuidae. It was described by Georg Friedrich Treitschke in 1835. It is found in Algeria, Egypt, Libya, Morocco, Tunisia, Portugal and Spain, as well as on Sardinia, Sicily and Malta. It has also been recorded from Turkey and possibly Syria and Israel.

The wingspan is 36–44 mm. Adults are on wing in October and November.

Description from Seitz
Forewing pale ochreous, the veins and costal streak greyish white.
The ab. lata Tr. (5a) is darker, greyer without the brown tinge [than crassa Hbn. (= huguenini Ruhl)].

References

External links

 "Agrotis lata (Treitschke, 1835)". Insecta.pro. Retrieved February 4, 2020.

Moths described in 1835
Agrotis
Moths of Europe
Moths of Africa
Moths of the Middle East